Vriesea lancifolia is a species of flowering plant in the Bromeliaceae family. It is endemic to Brazil.

References

lancifolia
Flora of Brazil
Taxa named by Lyman Bradford Smith
Taxa named by John Gilbert Baker